Harnage is a village in England.

Harnage may also refer to:

Harnage baronets
Sir George Harnage, 1st Baronet (1767–1836), British businessman
Phil Harnage, American screenwriter
Blake Harnage (born 1988), American songwriter and composer